The Great Frost, as it was known in England, or  ("The Great Winter"), as it was known in France, was an extraordinarily cold winter in Europe in 1708–1709, and was the coldest European winter during the past 500 years.

Notability
Derham wrote in Philosophical Transactions: "I believe the Frost was greater (if not more universal also) than any other within the Memory of Man."

During the Great Northern War, the Swedish invasion of Russia was notably weakened by the severe winter. Sudden winter storms and frosts killed thousands during the Swedish army's winter offensives, most notably during a single night away from camp that killed at least 2,000. Because the Russian troops were more prepared for the harmful weather  and cautiously stayed within their camps, their losses were substantially lower, contributing heavily to their eventual victory at Poltava the following summer.

France was particularly hard hit by the winter, with the subsequent famine estimated to have caused 600,000 deaths by the end of 1710. Because the famine occurred during wartime, there were contemporary nationalist claims that there were no deaths from starvation in the kingdom of France in 1709.

This winter event has drawn the attention of modern-day climatologists in the European Union's Millennium Project because they are presently unable to correlate the known causes of cold weather in Europe today with weather patterns documented in 1709. According to Dennis Wheeler, a climatologist at the University of Sunderland: "Something unusual seems to have been happening".

The severity of the winter is thought to be an important factor in the emigration of the German Palatines from central Europe.

Elizabeth Charlotte, Madame Palatine, the Duchess of Orléans, had written a letter to her great aunt in Germany describing how she was still shivering from cold and could barely hold her pen despite having a roaring fire next to her, the door shut, and her entire person wrapped in furs. She wrote, "Never in my life have I seen a winter such as this one."

European Union Millennium Project
One of the key aims of the European Union Millennium Project is climate reconstruction. This objective has gained significance in recent years because scientists are exploring the precise causes for climate variations instead of merely accepting they are within an acceptable historical range. As of 2009, climate models did not appear to be entirely effective for explaining the weather of 1709.

References 

1708 in Europe
1709 in Europe
Cold waves in Europe
1708 cold waves
1709 cold waves
Weather events in Europe
1709 in Russia